Red hand may refer to:

People
Owain Lawgoch (Eng translation: Owain of the Red Hand), the title given to Owain ap Thomas ap Rhodri, a Welsh soldier who led a Free Company fighting for the French against the English in the Hundred Years' War and a claimant to the title of Prince of Gwynedd and of Wales

Arts, entertainment, and media 
Red Hand, a rebel group in the American television series Colony
 Band of the Red Hand, a fictional military group from The Wheel of Time series
 "Red Hand Case", a song by band Modest Mouse
 Red Hand of Doom, a Dungeons and Dragons game
 "Red Right Hand", a song by Nick Cave and the Bad Seeds
 The Red Hand Gang, a television show

Organizations
 La Main Rouge (English translation: The Red Hand), an armed group operating in French North Africa in the 1950s
 Red Hand Commando, a small Ulster loyalist paramilitary group in Northern Ireland, which is closely linked to the Ulster Volunteer Force (UVF)
 Red Hand Defenders (RHD), an Ulster loyalist paramilitary group in Northern Ireland

Other uses
 Red Hand Day or International Day against the Use of Child Soldiers, February 12 each year, is an annual commemoration day on which pleas are made to political leaders and events are staged around the world to draw attention to the fates of child soldiers
 Red Hand of Ulster, an Irish symbol used in heraldry to denote the Irish province of Ulster

See also 
 Black Hand (disambiguation)
 Red hands
 Red-handed (disambiguation)
 White hand (disambiguation)